Redstone Lake is a lake located in geographic Semple Township in the Unorganized North Part of Sudbury District in Northeastern Ontario, Canada. It is in the James Bay drainage basin and is part of the Redstone River system.

Hydrology
The primary inflow, at the southwest, and outflow, at the northeast, is the Redstone River. The Redstone River flows via the Frederick House River, the Abitibi River and the Moose River to James Bay.

References

Lakes of Sudbury District